The Inangahua River is located in the north-west of New Zealand’s South Island. It is a major tributary of the Buller River, where it joins at the town of Inangahua Junction.

The Reefton Power Station, now decommissioned, operated with water taken from the river from 1888 to 1949. The Inangahua's tributaries include the Waitahu River, Te Wharau River, and Awarau River.

The name Inangahua is from the Māori language; inanga means whitebait, small edible fish of Galaxias spp., and hua may mean the drying and preserving of them in sealed containers or may mean plenty of. The river was known for big catches of whitebait.

Prior to 1866 settlers sometimes used the name Thackeray River, rather than Inangahua. William Makepeace Thackeray was a close friend of Charles Buller, after whom the Buller River was named.

References

External links 

nzfishing.com  - fishing information for the river

Buller District
Rivers of the West Coast, New Zealand
Rivers of New Zealand